Harold Henry Collins (9 August 1887 – 12 July 1962) was a politician in Queensland, Australia. He was a Member of the Queensland Legislative Assembly.

Politics
Collins was a member of the Tinaroo Shire Council from 1916 to 1917.

Collins was the Labor member for Cook in the Queensland Legislative Assembly from 1935 to 1950 and for Tablelands from 1950 to 1957, when he defected to the breakaway Queensland Labor Party.

Later life
Collins died in 1962. He was accorded a State funeral and buried in Brisbane's Hemmant Cemetery.

References

1887 births
1962 deaths
Queensland Labor Party members of the Parliament of Queensland
Members of the Queensland Legislative Assembly
Place of birth missing
Australian Labor Party members of the Parliament of Queensland
20th-century Australian politicians
People from Alexandra, Victoria